= Vishvaraj Environment Ltd. =

Indian company

Vishvaraj Environment Limited
- Industry: Water, Waste Water & Transport
- Founded: 1999
- Area served: India
- Key people: Arun Lakhani

Vishvaraj Environment Limited is an Indian company headquartered in Nagpur, Maharashtra. The company stands on PPP (public- private partnership) model.

The company started its operations with PPP-BOT projects in the roads & highways sector and subsequently diversified into Water Supply projects. The company started the first ever 24X7 full city water supply project in India - ‘Nagpur 24X7 Water Supply Scheme’. Many other cities are replicating the model. The company also advocates that “Sewage” which is a nuance for any town is actually a great resource when treated and can be used by industries to save fresh water for people and agriculture. The company is developing largest PPP project of 200 MLD capacity with reuse of treated water as the basic objective.

The company was established in 1999.

== History ==
In 1999, Mr. Arun Lakhani acquired Vishvaraj Housing Company Pvt Ltd. In the year 2000, the company's name was changed to Vishvaraj Environment Limited.

Vishvaraj Environment Limited is a firm in the infrastructure space working in the highways, water and wastewater sectoring. It is a company that is focused on developing Water and Highway projects.

Vishvaraj Environment Limited specializes in three broad, high potential sectors –

- Water
- Waste Water and
- Transportation

== Business Divisions ==
=== Transportation ===
India boasts of 3.3 million km of highways, with 80,000 km of National highways and 131,000 km of State highways. Vishvaraj spotted opportunity in roads sector way back in 2000 and decided to stay focused on BOT projects. It made a humble start with the development of 8.3 km Bypass road on BOT basis, which was one of the first BOT concessions awarded at that time. Vishvaraj has 6 projects in its Highway Business Portfolio covering 1,116 Lane kilometers and estimated Project costs of Rs.21,955 million. Its projects are across Maharashtra and Madhya Pradesh.

=== Waste Water ===
The company is developing largest PPP project of 200 MLD capacity with reuse of treated water as the basic objective Vishvaraj Infrastructure, which started off with BOT road projects in Maharashtra, has diversified into integrated water supply, waste water treatment and reuse segments.

"Around 38,250 MLD of wastewater is generated by tier-I and II cities, which is estimated to grow 3.5 times to 1,32,250 MLD by 2050. The waste water treatment capacity in the country is only around 30 percent of the total generation, but only 55 percent of this is operational.
